University of Qom is an Iranian public university located in Qom.

Following an endorsement by the Council of the Islamic Revolution and under the supervision of the Society of Seminary Teachers of Qom, the University of Qom was founded in 1980 (1358 SH) under the name of High Educational and Legal School of the Seminarians of Qom by Mohammad Beheshti, Mohammad Javad Bahonar, and Mehdi Ghazi Khorramabadi. It is considered one of the academic centers in the field of legal studies. In 1985 (1364 SH), following confirmation by the Supreme Council of the Cultural Revolution, the school admitted students from high school graduates, too. In 1997 (1376 SH), the university got its current name.

The university has an area of 140 ha and consists of 6 faculties, 7 research and technology centers, 10 research groups, 33 academic departments, and 164 academic fields. It also has about 10,000 students (in Bachelor, Master, and Ph.D. degrees) and 282 members of academic staff: 12 full professors, 90 associate professors, 160 assistant professors, and 20 instructors. Some of them are regarded as national genius figures. Most of the university's activities are in the fields of civil engineering, IT and computer engineering, industrial engineering, mechanical engineering and laws.

Faculties & departments
Currently, University of Qom consists of the following faculties and departments:

Faculty of Engineering
The Faculty of Engineering was established in 2003 as the first center of engineering fields in Qom Province and during less than two decades has had a significant growth in quantitative and qualitative development in engineering fields and the number of students.

Currently, this faculty consists of these departments:

 Department of Civil Engineering
 Department of Computer Engineering and Information Technology
 Department of Industrial Engineering
 Department of Mechanical Engineering
 Department of Architectural Engineering
 Department of Electrical Engineering
 Department of Chemical Engineering

Faculty of Basic Sciences
Four years after the establishment of physics and mathematics fields at the undergraduate level, and considering the growth in the number of students in these two academic fields and the need to launch other fields of basic sciences in 2001, the Faculty of Basic Sciences was established.

Currently, this faculty consists of these departments:

 Department of Physics
 Department of Mathematics
 Department of Chemistry
 Department of Statistics
 Department of Biology
 Department of Computer Science

Faculty of Management and Economics 
The Faculty of Management and Economics is one of the new faculties of UQ, which was established in 2011 as an independent faculty in Qom University according to the increasing needs of the province for the education of committed and specialized manpower in the private and public sectors.

Currently, this faculty consists of these departments:

 Department of Business Management
 Department of Industrial Management
 Department of Accounting
 Department of Economics

Faculty of Literature and Humanities 
The Faculty of Literature and Humanities started its activities in 2001.

Currently, this faculty consists of these departments:

 Department of Persian Language and Literature
 Department of English Language and Literature
 Department of Arabic Language and Literature
 Department of Educational Sciences
 Department of Physical Education
 Department of Information Sciences and Knowledge Studies

Faculty of Law 
The Faculty of Law is one of the most experienced higher law education centers in the country, which has been able to play a very important role in the training of jurists, lawyers, and professors. Currently, law education at the undergraduate, postgraduate and doctoral levels are available in various areas of interest at this faculty.

Currently, this faculty consists of these departments:

 Department of International and Public Law
 Department of Private Law
 Department of Intellectual Property Law
 Department of Criminology and Criminal Law

Faculty of Theology and Islamic Studies 
The administrative organization of the Faculty of Theology and Islamic Studies and its four departments was officially established in 2001.

Currently, this faculty consists of these departments:

 Department of Quran and Hadith Sciences
 Department of Jurisprudence and the Concept of Law
 Department of Philosophy of Ethics
 Department of Islamic Philosophy and Theology
 Department of Islamic Studies
 Department of Shia studies

University of Qom students social network

University of Qom students social network is a website that enables users to chat, send and read text and share their images and videos.

Ranking
Webometrics Ranking of World Universities 
Global university 2890  
Asia university 1003
Middle East university 207
International University 66th
 Unirank
Global University 4926
International University 72
scimago 
Global University  547th (1852th)
International University 30th

Notable alumni
Ammar al-Hakim (Arabic: سید عمار الحكيم‎), Iraqi cleric and politician who led the Islamic Supreme Council of Iraq from 2009 to 2017
Dhiyaa Al-Musawi, born in Bahrain 1970, politician, author, writer, and former cleric
Mohammad Arab-Salehi born 1963, philosopher and associate professor of religion
Seyyed Hassan Eslami Ardakani, born 1960, philosopher and professor of ethics
Sayed Muhammad Hassan Sharifi Balkhabi (Dari: سید محمد حسن شریفی بلخابی), politician
Mohsen Kadivar, visiting scholar at Islamic Legal Studies Program of Harvard Law School in 2002, visiting professor of Islamic studies at the University of Virginia (2008-2009), and at Duke University (fall 2009 - spring 2014), who held the fall 2014 Keohane Distinguished Visiting Professorship of University of North Carolina at Chapel Hill and is currently a research professor of Islamic Studies in the department of religious studies at Duke University
Mansour Leghaei, born 1962, the founder and a director of the Imam Husain Islamic Centre and the School of Islamic Theology in Earlwood, Australia
Hamid Naderi Yeganeh (Persian: حمید نادری یگانه), born 1990, mathematical artist and digital artist

References

External links

Qom
Educational institutions established in 1980
1980 establishments in Iran
Buildings and structures in Qom
Education in Qom Province
Law schools in Iran